The Ford Fieldhouse is multi-purpose arena in Grand Rapids, Michigan, USA, on the campus of Grand Rapids Community College. The Fieldhouse houses a gymnasium that seats 4,000 and a natatorium that seats 2,000. The gymnasium is now home to the Grand Rapids Community College Raiders and the Grand Rapids Flight, a basketball team in the International Basketball League.

References

External links 
Grand Rapids Community College website

Indoor arenas in Michigan
Sports venues in Michigan
Basketball venues in Michigan
Sports in Grand Rapids, Michigan
Buildings and structures in Grand Rapids, Michigan
Tourist attractions in Grand Rapids, Michigan